Erick Arnoldo Scott Bernard (born 21 May 1981 in Limón) is a Costa Rican professional footballer who currently plays for Limón.

Club career
Scott joined the Columbus Crew of Major League Soccer on loan in March 2004, after several exceptional years with Alajuelense, with whom he had played since May 2001. Scott scored 13 goals in the 2001-02 season, and another 20 in the 2002-03 season, propelling Alajuelense to two straight league titles. Scott also scored several goals against MLS and Mexican league teams in the CONCACAF Champions Cup, and was a key player during his first episode with Alajuelense.

After joining the Crew, however, Scott saw minimal playing time, and did not return for the 2005 season. He was picked up by Real Salt Lake with the last pick of the 2004 MLS Expansion Draft, but was not brought into the squad. Instead, he stayed in Costa Rica and returned to Alajuelense.

Scott found himself playing with a different squad and a different manager at Alajuelense, and his performances were not up to the level there were when he left the squad less than a year before. Accordingly, he wasn't involved in many matches during what was left of the 2005 Clausura tournament. Observers expected him to begin the following Apertura tournament in the starting line-up but due some differences with fans and some members of the managerial team, he was sent on loan for 6 months to Marathón in Honduras.

He returned to fitness and started playing well for Marathón, scoring important goals as the club won the 2007 championship. This resulted in attention from clubs in the Chinese Super League, and ultimately in a move to Shanghai Shenhua in January 2008 along with Honduran player Emil Martinez. They were teammates at Alajuelense and at Marathón and were acquired together by the Chinese team. He returned to Marathón ahead of the 2009 Clausura.

In summer 2010, Scott moved to Salvadoran side Luis Ángel Firpo after Alajuelense did not want to renew his contract. In summer 2011, Scott joined Saprissa from San Carlos only to leave them in January 2012 for Santos de Guápiles.

In June 2013, Scott joined Cartaginés, only for the club to release him a year later.

International career
Scott has made 28 appearances for the senior Costa Rica national team, scoring 7 goals in the process. At the youth level, he appeared in the 2001 World Youth Championship held in Argentina as well as the 2004 Summer Olympics. Scott made his debut for the senior team in a friendly match against Ecuador on October 16, 2002. He has appeared in the UNCAF Nations Cup 2003 and UNCAF Nations Cup 2005, as well as the 2003 CONCACAF Gold Cup held in the United States. Additionally, he appeared in five qualifying matches for the 2006 FIFA World Cup.

Scott was recently called into the Costa Rica national team for a 2010 FIFA World Cup qualifying match, where he was an unused substitute.

Career statistics

International goals
Scores and results list. Costa Rica's goal tally first.

References

External links
 

1981 births
Living people
Costa Ricans
People from Limón Province
Association football forwards
Costa Rican footballers
Costa Rica international footballers
Olympic footballers of Costa Rica
Footballers at the 2004 Summer Olympics
2003 UNCAF Nations Cup players
2003 CONCACAF Gold Cup players
2005 UNCAF Nations Cup players
L.D. Alajuelense footballers
Columbus Crew players
C.D. Marathón players
Shanghai Shenhua F.C. players
Chinese Super League players
C.D. Luis Ángel Firpo footballers
A.D. San Carlos footballers
Deportivo Saprissa players
Santos de Guápiles footballers
C.S. Cartaginés players
Costa Rican expatriate footballers
Expatriate soccer players in the United States
Expatriate footballers in Honduras
Expatriate footballers in China
Costa Rican expatriate sportspeople in China
Expatriate footballers in El Salvador
Liga FPD players
Major League Soccer players
Liga Nacional de Fútbol Profesional de Honduras players
Copa Centroamericana-winning players